Halifax is a federal electoral district in Nova Scotia, Canada. It is one of a handful of ridings which has been represented continuously (albeit with different boundaries) in the House of Commons since Confederation in 1867.

The riding of Halifax includes the communities of Spryfield, Sambro, Herring Cove, Harrietsfield, Williamswood, Prospect, Purcell's Cove, Armdale, Cowie Hill, Fairmount, Kline Heights, and the Halifax Peninsula.

History

The electoral district was created at Confederation in 1867.  It returned two members until 1968.

The most notable of the riding's MPs was Robert Borden, who was Conservative leader from 1901–1920, and Prime Minister of Canada from 1911-1920. Borden represented the riding from 1896–1904 and again from 1909-1917. Another notable MP was Robert Stanfield, leader of the Progressive Conservative Party from 1967-1976, who represented the riding from 1968-1979.

Halifax was represented by the New Democratic Party from 1997 to 2015, with the Liberal Party coming in second in every election from 2000 to 2015.  The riding's boundaries were re-distributed in 2004.  Before that date, it comprised the peninsula of Halifax, the community of Fairview, and part of Clayton Park.

Alexa McDonough, who stepped down as NDP leader in 2003, but stayed on to represent Halifax in the House of Commons. McDonough ran for re-election against popular city councillor Sheila Fougere in 2004, who came within 1000 votes of beating the incumbent. McDonough pulled ahead based in part on a strong showing in Halifax's North End.  On June 2, 2008, McDonough announced that she would not seek re-election.

Following the 2012 redistribution, the riding will be gaining a small part of the riding of Halifax West, on the eastern side of Long Lake Provincial Park.

Demographics

All information presented is according to the Canada 2016 Census.
Ethnic Groups: 80% European, 4.4% African Canadian, 3.8% Chinese, 3.2% Indigenous, 2.8% South Asian, 2.6% Arab 
Average Age: 40.0
Average Household Size: 2.0
Languages (Mother Tongue): 83.7% English, 2.4% Arabic, 2.4% Mandarin, 2.3% French
Median household income: $56,207

Geography
The district includes the old city of Halifax except for the extreme western part, the area along the west coast of Halifax Harbour and along the Atlantic Ocean until Pennant. It also includes Sable Island.

Members of Parliament
Halifax was a two-member riding from 1867 to 1968, electing its members through Block Voting. Since 1968, it has elected just one MP in each election, electing its member though First past the post.

This riding has elected the following Members of Parliament:

Election results

2021 general election

2019 general election

2015 general election

2011 general election

2008 general election

2006 general election

2004 general election

2000 general election

1997 general election

1993 general election

1988 general election

1984 general election

1980 general election

1979 general election

1974 general election

1972 general election

1968 general election

Halifax, 1867–1968 (two members)

See also
 List of Canadian federal electoral districts
 Past Canadian electoral districts

References

Notes

External links

 Riding history for Halifax (1867– ) from the Library of Parliament

Nova Scotia federal electoral districts
Politics of Halifax, Nova Scotia